
Shabtai (Sabbatai, Sabbathai, Shabbatai, Shabbethai, etc.) is a Jewish name common in the Middle Ages for boys born on Shabbat, and may refer to:

People

Given name
 Shabtai (given name)

Surname
Aharon Shabtai (born 1939), poet and translator
Benny Shabtai,  Israeli American businessman, investor, and philanthropist
Yaakov Shabtai (1934–81), Israeli novelist, playwright, and translator
Kobi Shabtai, 19th Commissioner of Israel Police

Organizations
Shabtai (society), a global Jewish membership society of Yale University students, alumni, and current and former faculty

Other uses
Sallah Shabati, Israeli comedy film 
Saturn (known as Shabtai in Hebrew)